Magdeburg Hauptbahnhof (German for Magdeburg main station, sometimes translated as Magdeburg Central Station) is the main railway station in the city of Magdeburg in the northern part of the German state of Saxony-Anhalt.

Importance 
The station is the main station of Magdeburg and along with Halle Hauptbahnhof the centre of long-distance rail transport in Saxony-Anhalt. It is also connected to the Magdeburg S-Bahn network and the HarzElbeExpress regional rail network.

History 
The current main station is built on the site of the western side of the former Magdeburg Fortress. Several competing railway companies had built lines to Magdeburg between 1839 and 1849, each with their own stations. They were built on the west bank of the Elbe river, on reclaimed land. With the increasing industrialisation and growing importance of Magdeburg, the need for space at stations grew. A central station, however, was not feasible at first.

As the existing railway facilities in Magdeburg became more inadequate the construction of a central station became more urgent. Both the city of Magdeburg and various railway companies conducted lengthy negotiations with the military with the objective of buying the grounds of the disused fortress. In 1870, three railway companies, the Berlin-Potsdam-Magdeburg Railway, the Magdeburg-Halberstadt Railway, Magdeburg-Leipzig Railway finally reached an agreement to buy the 33 hectares of the fortifications from the state of Prussia.

Construction 

The foundation stone for the new Magdeburg station was laid in 1870. The companies involved were the Berlin-Potsdam-Magdeburg Railway, the Magdeburg-Halberstadt Railway, both of which had been strongly affected by the confined spaces of the stations on the banks of the Elbe, and lastly, the Magdeburg-Leipzig Railway which was less troubled by its existing infrastructure.

The companies built two entrance buildings. The Magdeburg-Leipzig Railway constructed the eastern entrance building in the style of a Tuscan palace between 1872 and 1882. Its cladding consists of sandstone obtained from Königslutter. The western entrance building was built by the Berlin-Potsdam-Magdeburg Railway and was shared with the Magdeburg-Halberstadt Railway. In contrast to the eastern building, Nebra sandstone was used for the north facade of the western building, its walls were made of bricks faced with stone. Both buildings were of equal length and connected with each other by separate tunnels for passengers and baggage.

On 15 May 1873 the first train ran between the new station and the town of Burg. The official opening took place on 18 August 1873. Construction works continued until 1893. In addition to the passenger station there were also extensive freight facilities.

On 1 July 1923 the first electric train ran from Zerbst to Magdeburg Hauptbahnhof. Electrification had begun in 1910, but had been interrupted by World War I. From 7 October 1934 electric trains also ran to Halle.

Damage in World War II 
As an infrastructure building, the central station was subject of heavy bombing during World War II. On 16 January 1945 the station was hit in a severe air raid on the city. The western station building was completely destroyed and never rebuilt, while the eastern entrance building was heavily damaged and the platform halls were partially collapsed. The tracks were littered with bomb craters and the signal boxes were partially destroyed by the bombing.

Reconstruction after 1945 

At the end of March 1946, the restoration of the electrification had been completed on the rail networks in the Soviet occupation zone. Then, the Soviet military authorities then demanded the removal of the overhead line equipment and the transfer of the electrical rolling stock as reparations to the Soviet Union, which was partly returned in the early 1950s in need of repair. The rail network was then electrified for the third time, and electric train operation resumed in 1956. Reconstructed of the main station started in 1946, but the platform halls were omitted.

In 1974, the Magdeburg S-Bahn was established. More extensive alterations were made in 1984. After German reunification in 1992, platforms were lengthened to allow Intercity-Express operation. In 2003, the pedestrian tunnel was extended to connect the various platforms to an entrance on the western side of the station. The station was modernised again between 2008 and 2015 at a cost of about €300 million.

Train services
The following services currently call at the station:

References

External links
Construction work information of Deutsche Bahn 
Construction work information of the City of Magdeburg 
A Moment in Magdeburg In 1970 the British Military Train pauses in Magdeburg Hauptbahnhof.

Hauptbahnhof
Railway stations in Germany opened in 1873